Exempt market securities are securities issued in Canada that fall under National Instrument 45-106. They are exempt from prospectus requirements and hence require less disclosure than a prospectus offering.  To sell a security in the exempt market, an issuer must ensure that the investor qualifies under a specific exemption contained in the Instrument.  Common exemptions include:

 issue an offering memorandum 
 sell only to accredited investors;
 sell only to family, friends and business associates;
 or sell a minimum of $150,000 per transaction.

Exempt market securities may involve a higher level of risk. There are no established secondary markets for exempt market securities and they are illiquid.  Notably, unlike publicly traded companies, issuers of exempt market securities are not required to provide continuous disclosure to investors.  Exempt market securities may be sold by an Exempt Market Dealer or Investment Dealer, or, in certain provinces, directly by an issuer under the North-Western Order, which is an exemption from registration requirements, with some conditions.

Due Diligence Issues
Exempt market securities may or may not have detailed disclosure depending on the exemption relied on so it is important for potential investors to ensure that they perform appropriate due diligence of their own (arguably this is necessary for any investment regardless of whether it is offered under prospectus or not).  The following is a non-exhaustive list of some due diligence issues to address:

 Experienced management team – Work with teams that have a track record at both the investment management level and at the operational level – there is NO substitute for a track record of successful investment and operation in the business area by the team you are trusting to act on your behalf.
  Clear investment premise – The investment premise should be based on sound fundamental analysis that is simple to understand and clearly laid out in the presentation. Avoid momentum-based investments where the core rationale is effectively that “everyone else is doing it”.
 Tax efficient structure – Tax can have a major effect on your returns. Make sure that all reasonable and credible steps have been taken by the management team to manage tax obligations.
 Audited financial statements – Management must provide annual audited financial statements. A past failure to do so should act as a red flag.
 Regular operational reporting – Management must be open and available to answer your questions about the business.
 Clearly defined hold period – Make sure that the hold period is clearly defined and cannot be arbitrarily changed or extended by the management team. You need to know how long your investment will be committed and exactly when you can expect repayment.
 No non-arms length transactions – Situation where the management team acquires the target assets first and then sells them to the fund for an upfront profit. Even if disclosed in the offering documents this is a poor practice and creates a mismatch between the economic interests of the management team and the interests of the investors.
 No acquisition fees - Fees where the management team gets paid a portion of all capital deployed. This creates a mismatch between the economic interests of the management team and the interests of the investors, as acquisition fees are not tied to returns.
 No fee escalation – Management fees should not be tied to appraised or calculated asset value that is an unrealized gain. The only valuations that matter are the purchase price and the sale price. Management should receive the bulk of their fees based on gains that are actually realized for investors.
 Incentives reward ACHIEVED performance – Favor investments where the manager makes the bulk of his return only when you make a return. This fee structure is commonly referred to as “success based”. Lifts, acquisition fees and escalating annual management fees are not success based.

References

Securities (finance)